Mecca Normal is a two-piece indie rock band from Vancouver, British Columbia, Canada, formed by Jean Smith and David Lester in 1984. Smith writes and performs in a style that is often considered confrontational and laced with feminist themes; Lester's melodic yet dissonant guitar swirls and loops around her vocals. Merging the personal with the political in their songs and art-related activism, they helped define the sound and spirit of the early diy/indie rock/riot grrrl movement alongside bands such as Beat Happening and Bikini Kill.

Career
In 1985 they formed their own record label Smarten Up! to release their debut album. Subsequently, Mecca Normal had full-length releases on three of the largest indie labels of the 90s, with albums on K Records, Kill Rock Stars, Matador Records, and Smarten Up! and a 7" single released by Sub Pop. Smarten Up! later merged with Lester's small press publishing company Get To The Point to form the label Smarten Up! & Get To The Point on which they released an album in 2003.

Much of Mecca Normal's album The Observer (Kill Rock Stars, 2006) was inspired by Smith's experiences using online dating websites.

Empathy for the Evil (M'lady's Records, 2014) was produced, mixed and mastered by Kramer. Most of the songs are directly out of two of Jean Smith's unpublished novels. The album was recorded by Rat Bastard in November, 2012 at the Laundry Room in Miami Beach, Florida.

Other activities
Smith is a painter and the author of two published novels, and Lester is a graphic designer and painter whose work includes "Inspired Agitators" - a series of posters profiling specific left-wing activists.

Lester's graphic novel The Listener (Arbeiter Ring Publishing, 2011) was nominated for a ForeWord Reviews' Book Of The Year Award in the graphic novel category.

Smith also formed 2 Foot Flame with New Zealanders Peter Jefferies and Michael Morley. 2 Foot Flame released two LPs on Matador Records, 1995's self-titled LP, and 1997's Ultra Drowning.

Smith reads from her novels at literary events, and performs and records as a solo artist.

Discography
Mecca Normal (Smarten Up!, 1986)
Calico Kills The Cat (K Records, 1988)
Water Cuts My Hands (K Records, 1991)
Dovetail (K Records, 1992)
Jarred Up (K Records, 1993)
Flood Plain (K Records, 1993)
Sitting on Snaps (Matador Records, 1995)
The Eagle And The Poodle (Matador Records, 1996)
Who Shot Elvis? (Matador Records, 1997)
The Family Swan (Kill Rock Stars, 2002)
Janis Zeppelin (Smarten Up!, 2003)
The Observer (Kill Rock Stars, 2006)
Empathy for the Evil (M'lady's Records, 2014)
Brave New Waves Session (Artoffact, 2019)

References

External links
Mecca Normal homepage
Mecca Normal newsletter
Mecca Normal on Epitonic
PUNKCAST#965 Live video @ Union Docs, Brooklyn, May 7, 2006. (RealPlayer, mp4)

K Records artists
Feminist musicians
Proto-riot grrrl bands
Musical groups established in 1984
Musical groups from Vancouver
Canadian musical duos
Canadian indie rock groups
1984 establishments in British Columbia